Thomas Robert Hay-Drummond, 11th Earl of Kinnoull (5 April 1785 – 18 February 1866), styled Viscount Dupplin between 1787 and 1804, was a Scottish peer. His titles were Earl of Kinnoull, Viscount Dupplin and Lord Hay of Kinfauns in the Peerage of Scotland; and Baron Hay of Pedwardine in the Peerage of Great Britain.

Biography

Hay-Drummond was born in Bath, Somerset, the son of Robert Hay-Drummond, 10th Earl of Kinnoull and his second wife, Sarah Harley, daughter of Thomas Harley, Lord Mayor of London. Hay served as Lord Lyon King of Arms from 1804 until 1866, succeeding his father in that office.

He served as colonel of the Perthshire Militia from 1809 to 1855, and from 1830 to 1866 he was Lord Lieutenant of Perthshire.

Lord Kinnoull married Louisa Burton Rowley, daughter of Sir Charles Rowley, 1st Baronet, on 17 August 1824. They had nine children:

Lady Louisa Hay-Drummond, married Sir Thomas Moncreiffe, 7th Baronet; one of their daughters was Georgina Ward, Countess of Dudley
George Hay-Drummond, 12th Earl of Kinnoull (1827–1897)
Lady Sarah Hay-Drummond (1828–1859), married Hugh Cholmondeley, 2nd Baron Delamere of Vale Royal (b. 3 Oct 1811, d. 1 Aug 1887)
Captain Hon. Robert Hay-Drummond (1831–1855)
Lady Frances Hay-Drummond (died 1886)
Captain Hon. Arthur Hay-Drummond (1833–1900), Captain in the Royal Navy, succeeded to the Cromlix and Innerpeffray estates; married 1855 Katherine Derby
Lady Elizabeth Hay-Drummond (1835–1902), married Frederick Arthur
Lady Augusta Sophia Hay-Drummond (died 1915), mother of Geoffrey Twisleton-Wykeham-Fiennes, 18th Baron Saye and Sele
Colonel Hon. Charles Rowley Hay-Drummond (1836–1918)

He died in Torquay, Devon, where he had lived the last six months of his life. The earldom passed to his eldest son, George.

References

1785 births
1866 deaths
Lord Lyon Kings of Arms
11
Lord-Lieutenants of Perthshire
19th-century Scottish judges